Kuwait Petroleum Corporation is Kuwait's national oil company, headquartered in Kuwait City.

The activities of Kuwait Petroleum Corporation (KPC) are focused on petroleum exploration, production, petrochemicals, refining, marketing, and transportation. KPC produces about 7% of the world's total crude oil.

History and profile 
In 1934 KPC received the first Kuwait Oil Concession Agreement after it was originally formed by the Gulf Oil Corporation and the Anglo-Persian Oil Company. In 1975 the state signed agreements with British Petroleum and Gulf and after its shares were progressively increased,
Kuwait Petroleum Corporation was founded on 27 January 1980 as an umbrella company, integrating KOC, KNPC, KOTC and PIC and effectively placing them under government control. Between 1983 and 1987 KPC acquired most of Gulf Oil's refining operations in Western Europe. In 1992 KPC began to operate in Spain and in 1994 the company acquired BP's Luxembourg assets.

In May 2013 Nizar Al-Adsani was appointed chief executive officer of the corporation. In December 2018 Hashem Hashim was appointed as chief executive officer.

In January 2020, Kuwait Petroleum Corporation and QatarEnergy signed a 15-year sale and purchase agreement for the supply of up to 3 million tonnes of LNG to Kuwait annually. The agreement was signed in order to meet Kuwait's growing energy needs and the LNG delivery will begin from 2022. In March 2022, Nawaf Saud al-Sabah was appointed new CEO and KPC announced that it and all of its subsidiaries were to cut capital and operational spending for the year since the spread of the coronavirus caused serious problems in oil supply and prices. The cancellation of the Al-Dabdaba solar plant came in July 2020, which would have provided 15 percent of the electrical energy needed in the oil sector.

Production 
KPC planned to achieve crude oil production capacities in Kuwait of 3.0 million barrels per day by 2010, 3.5 million barrels per day by 2015 and 4.0 million barrels per day by 2020. Its revenue was US$251.94 billion in 2014.

Products 

The company's products have been sold in some countries under a subsidiary's name Q8. In Europe, Q8 has a network of more than 4,400 service stations across six countries: Italy, Denmark, Belgium, the Netherlands, Luxembourg and, in Sweden, as the OKQ8 joint venture.

In Scandinavia, Q8 runs 186 service stations, and 54 unmanned (under the F24 brand) in Denmark. In Sweden, a subsidiary of KPC, KPI-Q8's gas stations are known as OKQ8 – a result of a merger between Q8 and Swedish "OK", more than 900 is available, most of them unmanned.

In the Benelux, Kuwait Petroleum has a refinery in Europoort, Rotterdam, and is a partner in the Maasvlakte Olie Terminal, and runs 146 gas stations in the Netherlands. There are 404 Q8 stations in Belgium. Q8's large share of the Belgian market is due to the acquisition of Belgian BP offices in 1998 and the Aral stations in 1999. However, over the years, Q8 has closed many stations in residential areas and near apartment complexes. Like its competitors, Q8 also has a network of unmanned gas stations called Q8 Easy. In Belgium, Q8 has formed a partnership of sorts with Delhaize Shop'n Go. This is a small convenience store where ready-to-use and on-the-go products are sold. However, it still is able to offer a wide variety of automotive services. They have extensive hours, and are often combined with a Panos Corner bakery.

There are no more Q8 stores in the UK, after being bought out in 2004 by a joint venture company Refined Holdings, which was formed specifically for the sale. The Q8 brand has since then been phased out of the UK.

Kuwait Petroleum Corp., the state-run oil company, sold its crude oil at $3.95 a barrel below the regional benchmarks, the biggest discount since December 2008, Bloomberg reported 11 Dec. 2014. Saudi Arabia and Iraq also cut oil prices for Asia following the Organization of Petroleum Exporting Countries' decision to maintain production levels, which ensured that global oil prices would stay low. It seemed likely that Middle Eastern countries were lowering prices to defend their market shares. Kuwait has sold crude oil to Asia at a discount since at least 2000.

Subsidiaries 

The subsidiary companies of KPC are:
 Kuwait Oil Company (KOC)
 Kuwait National Petroleum Company (KNPC)
 Petrochemicals Industries Company (PIC)
 Kuwait Oil Tanker Company (KOTC)
 Kuwait Foreign Petroleum Exploration Company (KUFPEC)
 Kuwait Petroleum International Limited (KPI – Q8)
 Kuwait Gulf Oil Company (KGOC)
 Kuwait Integrated Petroleum Industries Company (KIPIC)

KIPIC

Kuwait Integrated Petrochemical Industries Company (KIPIC) was established on 18 October 2016 as a new Subsidiary to Kuwait Petroleum Corporation (KPC). Bringing together some of the best industry expertise and world-class facilities, KIPIC's mission is to be the leader in integrated refining and petrochemicals operations and liquefied natural gas import in Kuwait's Al Zour Refinery.
KIPIC is responsible for operating and managing the largest grassroot integrated complex for refining, petrochemicals manufacture businesses and liquefied natural gas import facilities at Al-Zour complex.

See also 

 List of companies of Kuwait

References

External links 
 Official website
 Q8 UK website
 Q8 Official Website
 Q8 Danish Website
 Q8 Swedish Website

Kuwaiti brands
1980 establishments in Kuwait
Government agencies established in 1980
Oil and gas companies of Kuwait
National oil and gas companies
Automotive fuel retailers
Kuwaiti companies established in 1980